Mount Pleasant is a street in Liverpool city centre. It is towards one end of Hope Street, and is the location of the Liverpool Metropolitan Cathedral.

It is situated on the site of one of the hills which surrounded the village of Liverpool before it expanded to be one of the United Kingdom's major cities.

William Roscoe, the historian was born in Mount Pleasant in 1753. See , painted by Samuel Austin.

References

Streets in Liverpool